Throwaway may refer to:
 Disposable, single use
 "Throwaway", an episode of “The Shield”
 "Throwaway", a song by Mick Jagger from the album "Primitive Cool"
 Throwaway, the winner of the Ascot Gold Cup in 1904, as featured in James Joyce's novel Ulysses

See also
 Throwaway line, a joke delivered "in passing" without being the punch line to a comedy routine
 Throw-away society, a human society strongly influenced by consumerism
 "Thrown Away, a short story by Rudyard Kipling